The 2018 Kensington and Chelsea London Borough Council election took place on 3 May 2018 to elect members of Kensington and Chelsea London Borough Council in England. The election was held  on the same day as other local elections in England. While Kensington and Chelsea is usually regarded as a Conservative stronghold, there was media speculation that Labour could win control of the council in the wake of the Grenfell Tower fire. However the Conservatives maintained control, losing just one Councillor, in St. Helen's Ward, winning 36 seats to Labour's 13.

Overall results

Ward Results

Abingdon

Brompton and Hans Town

Campden

Chelsea Riverside

Colville

Courtfield

Dalgarno

Earl’s Court

Golborne

Holland

Norland

Notting Dale

Pembridge

Queen’s Gate
In May 2019, Palmer was expelled from the Conservatives, he now sits as an Independent.

Redcliffe

Royal Hospital

St Helen’s

Stanley

Heinz Schumi stood as an Independent candidate in 2014.

References

2018
2018 London Borough council elections
21st century in the Royal Borough of Kensington and Chelsea